Paradeudorix marginata, the black-edged fairy playboy, is a butterfly in the family Lycaenidae. It is found in Nigeria (east and the Cross River loop), Cameroon, the Republic of the Congo, the Central African Republic, the southern and eastern part of the Democratic Republic of the Congo, Uganda and north-western Tanzania. The habitat consists of primary forests.

References

Butterflies described in 1962
Deudorigini